José Fernandes Fafe (January 31, 1927 – February 20, 2017) was a Portuguese diplomat and writer. He is the author of more than 20 books, including poetry, romance and essays.

He was the ambassador of Portugal to Cuba (1974-1977), Mexico (1977-1980), Cabo Verde (1985-1990) and Argentina (1990-1992), being also itinerant ambassador to the Portuguese-speaking African countries.

References

1927 births
2017 deaths
Ambassadors of Portugal to Cuba
Ambassadors of Portugal to Mexico
Ambassadors of Portugal to Cape Verde
Ambassadors of Portugal to Argentina
Portuguese male writers
People from Porto